Gary Moore & The Midnight Blues Band – Live at Montreux 1990 is a live DVD by Gary Moore. Recorded live on 7 July 1990 and 9 July 1997 (bonussongs).

Founded in 1967, the Montreux Jazz Festival is recognized as one of the most prestigious annual music events in the world. This 1990 performance was the first for Gary Moore at the event. He has since played the festival on a regular basis. This was a part of the tour supporting his Still Got the Blues album. Albert Collins was a featured guest at this performance.

The DVD, released in 2004 by Eagle Vision, includes three bonus songs from Gary Moore's 1997 performance at Montreux.

Performances

1990 Performance
 "Oh Pretty Woman"
 "Walking By Myself"
 "The Stumble"
 "All Your Love"
 "Midnight Blues"
 "You Don't Love Me"
 "Still Got The Blues"
 "Texas Strut"
 "Moving On"
 "Too Tired" (featuring Albert Collins)
 "Cold Cold Feeling" (featuring Albert Collins)
 "Farther Up the Road" (featuring Albert Collins)
 "King of The Blues" (without Albert Collins)
 "Stop Messin' Around"
 "The Blues is Alright" (with Albert Collins)
 "The Messiah Will Come Again"

1997 Performance (bonus songs)
<LI>"Out In The Fields"
<LI>"Over The Hills & Far Away"
<LI>"Parisienne Walkways"

Personnel

1990 Concert Line Up
 Gary Moore - lead vocals, guitar
 Don Airey - keyboards
 Andy Pyle - bass guitar
 Graham Walker - drums
 Frank Mead - alto saxophone, harmonica
 Nick Pentelow - tenor saxophone
 Nick Payn - baritone saxophone
 Martin Drover - trumpet
Special Guest:
 Albert Collins - vocals, guitar (on tracks as noted)

1997 Concert Line Up (bonus songs) 
 Gary Moore - guitar, lead vocals
 Magnus Fiennes - keyboards
 Guy Pratt - bass guitar, backing vocals
 Gary Husband - drums

Production 
 Claude Nobs - Executive Producer for Montreux Sounds SA
 Terry Shand - Executive Producer for Eagle Vision
 Geoff Kempin - Executive Producer for Eagle Vision

Certifications

References

Live video albums
Gary Moore live albums
2004 live albums
2004 video albums